Mecochirus is an extinct genus of lobster-like decapod crustaceans, containing 17 species. The Maxberg Specimen of Archaeopteryx was initially assigned to the type species, Mechocirus longimanatus before it was realised that it belonged to Archaeopteryx lithographica.

Paleoecology 
Mecochirus rapax may have lived inside or produced Thalassinoides burrows.

References

Glypheidea
Jurassic crustaceans
Prehistoric animals of Europe